Kurtamysh is the name of several inhabited localities in Kurgan Oblast, Russia.

Urban localities
Kurtamysh (town), a town in Kurtamyshsky District

Rural localities
Kurtamysh (rural locality), a village in Rakovsky Selsoviet of Ketovsky District